Margaret Booth (1898–2002) was an American film editor.

Margaret Booth may also refer to:

Margaret Booth (judge) (1933–2021), British High Court judge
Margaret Booth (Paralympian), Australian Paralympic athlete and goalball player
Margaret Booth (jockey), winner of Torrey Pines Stakes